Aziz-ur-Rehman (born 31 March 1966) is a former Pakistani cricketer who played first-class cricket from 1983 to 1993.

A left-arm slow bowler, Aziz-ur-Rehman made his first-class debut in the 1983-84 season. In the first match of the 1984-85 season, competing in the Patron's Trophy, he took 7 for 45 for Sargodha in the second innings against Faisalabad to give Sargodha victory by 142 runs. In the next match a few days later against Gujranwala he took 6 for 70 and 5 for 74 in a victory by 19 runs. With 34 wickets at 15.35, he was the leading wicket-taker in the competition that season. He took his best match figures, and established the Sargodha record, in 1989-90 against Karachi Whites, with 13 for 78 (7 for 47 and 6 for 31).

Initially he played purely as a bowler, but later in his career he developed as an all-rounder. In his final match for Sargodha, the Quaid-e-Azam Trophy final in 1992-93, he opened the batting in the second innings and top-scored with 67. His top score was 84 not out, for Pakistan University Grants Commission against Pakistan Automobiles Corporation in 1991-92.

References

External links
 Aziz-ur-Rehman at CricketArchive
 Aziz-ur-Rehman at Cricinfo

1966 births
Living people
Pakistani cricketers
Sargodha cricketers
Pakistan University Grants Commission cricketers
Pakistan Railways cricketers
Cricketers from Sargodha